The 1981 Copa del Rey Final was the 79th final of the King's Cup. The final was played at Vicente Calderón Stadium in Madrid, on 18 June 1981, being won by Barcelona, who beat Sporting Gijón 3–1.

Details

References

1981
Copa
FC Barcelona matches
Sporting de Gijón matches
1980s in Madrid